Angelika Schafferer (born 1960) is an Austrian luger who competed during the late 1970s and early 1980s. She won the bronze medal in the women's singles event at the 1978 FIL World Luge Championships in Imst, Austria.

Schafferer also competed in three Winter Olympics in women's singles, earning her best finish of seventh at Lake Placid, New York in 1980.

She won the overall women's singles Luge World Cup title three times (1978-9, 1979–80, 1980–1).

References

External links
Hickok sports information on World champions in luge and skeleton.
List of women's singles luge World Cup champions since 1978.
SportQuick.com information on World champions in luge 
Wallenchinsky, David. (1984). "Luge: Women's Singles". In The Complete Book the Olympics: 1896-1980. New York: Penguin Books. p. 577.

1960 births
Living people
Austrian female lugers
Olympic lugers of Austria
Lugers at the 1972 Winter Olympics
Lugers at the 1976 Winter Olympics
Lugers at the 1980 Winter Olympics
20th-century Austrian women
21st-century Austrian women